Fernando Javier González (born 25 September 1988) is an Argentine professional footballer who plays as a left-back for San Martín Tucumán.

Career
Belgrano were González's opening senior team. After making his professional debut on 13 March 2009 against Chacarita Juniors, González made sixteen appearances in three Primera B Nacional seasons on the way to helping the club win promotion to the Primera División in 2010–11. He featured just once in the top-flight, before returning to tier two with Sarmiento in June 2012. He played thirty-eight times for them. Short stints with San Martín, as he won promotion, Temperley and Olimpo followed, with the latter two coming in the Primera División. Primera B Nacional's Douglas Haig signed González in 2016; where he'd suffer relegation.

González moved across to the other third division in 2017, agreeing terms with Estudiantes. He participated in three fixtures in Torneo Federal A, appearing twice against Unión Aconquija and once versus Deportivo Maipú. A return to Primera B Metropolitana was completed in 2018, with Barracas Central becoming his eighth club. He scored his first senior goal with them, netting in a 1–1 draw with San Miguel on 29 April 2019.

On 12 January 2022, González joined San Martín de Tucumán on a one-year deal.

Career statistics
.

Honours
Barracas Central
Primera B Metropolitana: 2018–19

References

External links

1988 births
Living people
Sportspeople from Buenos Aires Province
Argentine footballers
Association football defenders
Primera Nacional players
Argentine Primera División players
Torneo Federal A players
Primera B Metropolitana players
Club Atlético Belgrano footballers
Club Atlético Sarmiento footballers
San Martín de San Juan footballers
Club Atlético Temperley footballers
Olimpo footballers
Club Atlético Douglas Haig players
Estudiantes de Río Cuarto footballers
Barracas Central players
San Martín de Tucumán footballers